Rick Kosti is a Canadian retired ice hockey goaltender who was a two-time All-American for Minnesota Duluth.

Career
After wrapping up his junior career with the Weyburn Red Wings, Kosti began attending the University of Minnesota Duluth in 1983 and had an immediate impact on the program. Kosti's arrival coincided with the program's first WCHA title, in their 19 season of league play.  He also led the team to its first conference tournament championship and second NCAA Tournament appearance. Kosti's stellar play in net allowed the Bulldogs to win a very close quarterfinal match and then defeat North Dakota in overtime in the national semifinal to appear in the 1984 championship game. Kosti and the Bulldogs had control of the match for most of the game but a 3-goal third period from Bowling Green tied the game and the two ended up playing the longest title game in NCAA history. Kosti ended with 50 saves in the match but couldn't stop the last shot and UMD fell in the 4th overtime.

Kosti's sophomore season turned out even better as he set an NCAA record with 33 wins on the year. UMD repeated as dual WCHA champions and the team was expected to make a charge for the NCAA championship. The Bulldogs had an easier time with their quarterfinal match and made the frozen four, facing ECAC Hockey champion Rensselaer. The two teams fought a back and forth duel and ended regulation with a 5–5 tie. At the end of the second overtime a scrum broke out between the two and RPI began the third overtime with a power play. The Bulldogs couldn't stop the Engineers from taking advantage of the situation and were relegated to the consolation game where they ended their season with yet another overtime match, this time defeating Boston College 7–6. By happenstance, as of 2021 the loss to RPI was the last time Minnesota Duluth has lost an overtime game in the NCAA tournament.

After the season, Kosti gave up his final two years of eligibility and signed a professional contract with the Calgary Flames. He began the next season with the Moncton Golden Flames but ended up appearing in only 15 games during the season. He joined the Canadian national team in 1986 and played the next two years with the program, becoming the team's 3rd goaltender at the 1988 Winter Olympics because he didn't dress for any of the games he's sometimes left off of the roster. Kosti came close to appearing in an NHL game in November of that season. Regular starter Mike Vernon had taken a hard shot off the mask and was held out for precautionary reasons. Kosti was called up and served as a backup on the 21st against the Pittsburgh Penguins but rode the bench the entire game. When Vernon was cleared for the following match, Kosti was returned to the national team. After the Olympics, Kosti finished out the season with the Salt Lake Golden Eagles. After his entry-level deal with the Flames expired in 1988, it was not renewed and he wasn't invited to the team's training camp. Kosti retired as a player and began pursuing a career in business.

Kosti ended up at the University of Calgary, earning his MBA from the school. He moved to Houston, Texas and worked for several companies as a recruiter. As of 2021 he was working for Cisco Systems.

Statistics

Regular season and playoffs

International

Awards and honors

References

External links

1963 births
Living people
AHCA Division I men's ice hockey All-Americans
Canadian ice hockey goaltenders
Ice hockey people from Saskatchewan
Medicine Hat Tigers players
Minnesota Duluth Bulldogs men's ice hockey players
Moncton Golden Flames players
Salt Lake Golden Eagles (IHL) players